Idiomarina tyrosinivorans is a Gram-negative, strictly aerobic, non-spore-forming, curved-rod-shaped, tyrosine-metabolizing and motile bacterium from the genus of Idiomarina which has been isolated from water off the river Pingtung in Taiwan.

References

External links
Type strain of Idiomarina tyrosinivorans at BacDive -  the Bacterial Diversity Metadatabase

Bacteria described in 2016
Alteromonadales